Sri Mara may refer to:
 Sri Mara, or Ou Lian (192 AD) Champa king
 Sri Mara Sri Vallabha (815-860) Pandyan king